Jeremy Fall (born August 3, 1990) is an American chef, restaurateur, and entrepreneur. He is the co-founder and former CEO of J. Fall Group, which he sold in 2019. Fall is also the founder of the media company, jfall. Fall founded and operated restaurants and bars in Los Angeles, California and Chicago, Illinois. Fall also hosts a podcast, dinner party with jeremy fall (Dinner Party Podcast). He is the first chef and restaurateur to sign with Jay-Z’s entertainment company, Roc Nation.

Early life 
Of Tunisian, French, Caribbean, and Jewish descent, Fall was born and raised as an only child in Los Angeles, California. Fall's parents, born in Tunisia and France, emigrated to the United States before Fall was born. Fall's mother owned a café in Los Angeles. There, Fall's mother met Fall's future stepfather, who was a chef at the café.

Early career 

At the age of 16, following an internship promoting local night clubs, Fall launched his first venture, Mad City Entertainment, a Los Angeles artist management and event production company. Fall also worked for the entertainment and special event venue, Avalon Hollywood, serving as its promotions manager. In 2008, while attending Occidental College, Fall launched his second endeavor, Cliché Magazine, a digital magazine focused on fashion and music.

Career 

In 2014, at age 24, Fall opened three bars. The first was Genesis, a pop-up bar and nightclub located in a vintage Hollywood attic. His second pop-up bar, Golden Box, inspired by the 1980s Manhattan night club scene, opened in the former LA Writers Room. Fall expressed Golden Box to be an homage to the establishments, like Studio 54 and The Limelight, that his father frequented as a youth and young adult in New York. In December 2014, Fall re-opened the former Skid-Row Los Angeles dive bar, King Eddy Saloon.

In January 2016, Fall opened his first restaurant, Nighthawk: Breakfast Bar, a late-night breakfast and cocktail establishment, in Venice, California. His inspiration for the concept was, "a melting pot of world cultures and flavors, mixed with my nostalgia for American diners." Nighthawk became known for its lineup of original cocktails, including alcoholic cereal milk. Eater.com recognized Nighthawk on its list of "Hottest Bars from Coast to Coast" in North America. Nighthawk's “Spiked Cereal Milk” has been featured in Chowhound’s “5 Unexpected Cocktails to Drink Right Now in Los Angeles.”

Later in 2016, Fall collaborated with chef Alvin Cailan of Eggslut to open walk-up burger stand Easy's in Chinatown, LA.

In 2020, at age 29, Fall was named to Forbes 30 Under 30, Food & Drink list.

J. Fall Group 
In 2014, Fall met Henry Costa at Costa's West Hollywood sausage-centric restaurant, Link. In 2016, after sharing their respective restaurant and hospitality visions and aspirations, Fall partnered with the Wall Street investment banker-turned-chef and restaurateur to co-found the J. Fall Group hospitality enterprise. Fall managed the J. Fall Group's creative decisions as well as branding and marketing while Costa headed the company's finance and operations. Fall's vision for the J. Fall Group was to develop “Americana-inspired restaurants that didn’t follow any food trends and were nostalgic of our childhoods… to deliver an emotional connection to diners… and elevate the guest experience without requiring a high price tag.”

In November 2016, the duo opened the J. Fall Group's first concept, Tinfoil Liquor & Grocery, in Highland Park in Los Angeles. The New York City-inspired core concept included a street-front liquor store with a “hidden,” secret password-required speakeasy deli enterable through the rear of the establishment.

In November 2017, the J. Fall Group, expanding upon the Nighthawk brand, opened Nighthawk: AM, a daytime fast-casual concept to complement the original late-night concept, in Chicago. Fall later opened a second Nighthawk: AM location in the Beverly Center in Los Angeles.

In July 2018, Easy's Burger's moved locations, rebranded to “Easy’s” as a “twisted love child of Tupac and the Fonz,” and opened a full-service bar and restaurant with a ‘90s diner ambiance in the Beverly Center mall between Beverly Hills and West Hollywood.

In August 2018, Fall and the J. Fall Group partnered with United Talent Agency to open the atmospherically rock-and-roll Paperboy Pizza in the Gallery Food Hall in Santa Monica, California.

By 2019, Fall had opened 14 restaurant locations in total around the United States. That year, Los Angeles-based K2 Restaurants acquired the J. Fall Group and its existing restaurant brands, Nighthawk Breakfast Bar, Nighthawk: A.M., Tinfoil: Liquor & Grocery, Paperboy Pizza, and Easy’s, as well as then-upcoming and now-opened restaurant brands, Italian-themed Chapter and speakeasy, Jukebox, to be located within Chapter in Waco, Texas. Fall remained onboard as the creative director of the brands in year following the acquisition.

In 2019, following the K2 acquisition of the J. Fall Group, Fall and Costa opened 1980s-themed chicken tender restaurant, McFly’s Bird Shoppe, and the 1990s-themed Americana bar and restaurant, Unplugged, in reference to the MTV show, adjacent to one another in Five Points Lane in Birmingham, Alabama.

Other restaurant and food ventures 
In 2018, Fall’s chicken sandwich featured on menus at the Blue Ribbon restaurant locations in Los Angeles, New York City, and Las Vegas.

In August 2019, Fall opened his newest restaurant, Mixtape, aspired to be “a musical mixtape in restaurant form,” in the Fairfax District of Los Angeles. Reflecting Fall’s heritage, Mixtape’s menu features elements of Tunisian, Caribbean, Jewish, and French cuisine. The restaurant exhibits various visual art contributions from artists such as Quincy Jones, Jaden Smith, Vic Mensa, Brandon Boyd of Incubus, Tokimonsta, and Serj Tankian, as well as custom weekend brunch playlists compiled by Robin Thicke. Fall collaborated with rapper, Phora, to design the uniforms for Mixtape staff.

In 2021, Fall’s “J. Fall Blvd. Sandwich” became a featured item on the famous restaurant chain Mel’s Drive-In’s menu. Fall and Mel’s Diner also partnered to release for sale t-shirts featuring both Fall and Mel’s.

Fall has worked with the James Beard Foundation to prepare meals for the Foundation’s dinner events.

While dining at one of Fall’s restaurants, Prince once bet Fall that he could make better scrambled eggs than Fall, which resulted in Prince cooking eggs in Fall’s restaurant kitchen for patrons.

Television and media 
Fall has appeared on several network food and cooking television shows since 2016. In 2016, Bravo’s digital series, Going Off the Menu, featured Fall and his restaurant, Tinfoil, in an episode. In 2017, Fall appeared on two Guy Fieri-hosted Food Network shows – first, “The Bite” episode of Guy’s Big Project; and later, the “Breakfast, Brisket and Belly” episode of Diners, Drive-Ins and Dives, which featured Fall in his Nighthawk: Breakfast Bar kitchen. In 2018, Fall appeared on an episode of the Hallmark Channel’s Home & Family, on which he prepared his “Original Gangster Breakfast Sandwich.” Later in 2018, Fall appeared in two episodes of the Food Network’s Food Network Star.

Fall has also cooked on camera with celebrities such as Shay Mitchell (Pretty Little Liars, You, and Dollface) and TikTok star Charli D’Amelio on The D’Amelio Show. He has been interviewed on TYT Network’s Reasonably Shure as well as local news programs in the Los Angeles area.

Fall has appeared as a guest on several podcasts – Take A Knee (The Adam Carolla Show), hosted by Adam Carolla (March 2018); Purposely Awakened, hosted by Naomi Bonman (June 2018); Our Los Angeles Podcast (August 2019); and Redirected with Andrew East (March 2021) – with interview discussions of his experience growing up in Los Angeles and its culture, his personal life and career journey, and the restaurant and hospitality industry.

In 2021, Fall launched his self-hosted podcast, dinner party with jeremy fall (Dinner Party Podcast), releasing the premiere episode on June 23, 2021, with actor, host, and comedian, Lamorne Morris, as the podcast’s inaugural guest. Produced by Fall’s media company, jfall, dinner party centers around discussions of culture, mental health, and creativity. The guest list of dinner party has also included the likes of Shawn Johnson, Andrew Schulz, Tia Mowry, Jerry Ferrara, and Danny Green. Fall also assembled the “Dinner Party” Spotify playlist.

In 2021, Fall partnered with Grammy-winning artist, Miguel, to executive produce his first series, Beats for Breakfast, which airs on Facebook Watch. Starring both Fall and Miguel, each episode of Beats for Breakfast features Fall cooking a recipe while Miguel simultaneously creates new music beside Fall in the kitchen. According to Fall, the program originated from Miguel, when visiting Fall's Nighthawk restaurant, sharing the concept of a show in which Miguel made beats in his kitchen as Fall brought recipes to life. Episodes of Beats for Breakfast, including the show's first eight episodes, are posted on Miguel's Facebook page each Wednesday.

Partnerships, endorsements, and other business ventures 
In 2018, Fall became the first chef and restaurateur to sign with and be managed by Jay-Z's Roc Nation. Fall is also represented by United Talent Agency. Fall is a brand ambassador for Gucci.

In 2018, Fall collaborated with streetwear subscription box company, ThreadBeast, to curate a 1990s-themed box, which included Fall’s Easy’s “food porn” viewmaster.

In 2021, Fall founded his own media company, jfall, through which he produced and currently operates his dinner party with jeremy fall podcast.

Posting and sharing many of his food creations, Fall has built a presence across social media platforms, including one million followers of his Instagram account. He has leveraged this following and influence to land multiple corporate partnerships, including partnering with Mr. Holmes Bakehouse and American Express, to feature Fall’s “spiked cereal milk doughnuts” creation as well as another Mr. Holmes Bakehouse collaboration starring his “Just Try It” croissant-Cuban sandwich fusion.

Mental health advocacy 
Fall is an advocate for mental healthcare assistance. Fall's own struggles with mental health and anxiety dating back to his childhood served, in part, as motivation for his podcast, an objective of which is to stimulate conversation around mental health. Fall is involved with the Mental Health Coalition, for which he currently serves as an ambassador. In May 2021, Fall appeared on The Mental Health Coalition's 1-2-1 series to discuss topics and issues surrounding mental health. Fall believes that food and hospitality can be leveraged as a medium to address and discuss mental health and wellbeing.

In 2021, Fall also appeared on the cover of Sand Magazine as well as served as Guest Editor for the edition in an examination focusing on mental health and comfort food.

Filmography

Other media

Awards and recognition

 2016: Zagat 30 under 30
 2018: Magic Johnson’s The Playbook 32 under 32
2020: Forbes 30 under 30, Food & Drink

References

External links 

Nightclub owners
American restaurateurs
1990 births
Living people